The Cricket class and following classes of coastal destroyers were a series of small torpedo boat destroyers (TBDs) intended to complement the Royal Navy's s. The thirty-six vessels which broadly comprised this group actually consisted of several distinct classes, as each contractor built to their own designs, and even single contractor's designs evolved from year to year.

The first twelve vessels (comprising White's Cricket class, Thornycroft's Gadfly class and Yarrow's Mayfly class) were ordered in 1905 and launched in early 1906. In practice they were not strong enough for open ocean operations and were reclassified as 1st class torpedo boats. These first twelve had been given names but in October 1906 - after the first two vessels ran trials but before any had been delivered - all were then given the numbers TB 1 to TB 12 and their names were withdrawn.

The following two batches—each of twelve more boats, comprising TB 13 to TB 24 ordered under the 1906–07 Programme, and TB 25 to TB 36 under the 1907–08 Programme—were only ever given numbers and were on average  longer. These were only ever classified as 1st class torpedo boats. The last boat was launched in 1909. Those that survived the war (six were wartime losses - four from the 1905-06 batch and two from the 1906-07 batch) were sold off from 1919 to 1921.

They were built by six different yards (thirteen by White at Cowes, nine by Thornycroft (five at Chiswick and four at Woolston, Hampshire), four each by Denny at Dumbarton and by Hawthorn Leslie at Hebburn, and three each by Yarrow at Cubitt Town and by Palmers at Jarrow).

The boats differed in detail as each shipbuilder was allowed to construct to their own design, and the designs were modified and enlarged for the later batches, but all had two funnels with one of the torpedo tubes on the stern. These vessels closely resembled the earliest 26-knotter TBDs of 1892–93, having 'turtle-back' forecastles and carried a similar armament.

By 1914 all boats were serving in North Sea Patrol Flotillas or the Nore Local Defence Flotilla. TB 4 and TB 24 won the Battle Honour Belgian Coast 1915. In 1918 the four Denny-built boats were sent to the Mediterranean: TB 17 and TB 18 served at Gibraltar, TB 29 and TB 30 at Malta, where these went to the breakers in 1919.

Cricket-class (TB.1 to TB.5 - J. S. White 1905–1906 programme) 

The ships had turtleback forecastles and two funnels. Two oil-fuelled Yarrow water-tube boilers fed steam to three-stage Parsons steam turbines, driving three propeller shafts. The machinery was designed to give , with a speed of  specified.

Armament consisted of two 12-pounder (76-mm) 12 cwt guns, and three 18-inch (450 mm) torpedo tubes (in three single mounts). The ships had a crew of 39.

Gadfly-class (TB.6 to TB.10 - Thornycroft boats - 1905–1906 programme) 

As for the White-built boats, they had turtleback forecastles and two funnels. The ship's armament and crew was as the White-designed ships.

Mayfly Class (TB.11 to TB.12)

TB.13 Class (TB.13 to TB.16)

References

Notes

Bibliography

Destroyer classes
 
Ship classes of the Royal Navy